Chingola is a constituency of the National Assembly of Zambia. It covers the southern and western parts of Chingola and a rural area to the south-west of the city, including the town of Kashamata in Chingola District of Copperbelt Province.

The constituency was created in 1954 when the Mufulira–Chingola was split into two constituencies.

List of MPs

References

Constituencies of the National Assembly of Zambia
Constituencies established in 1954
1954 establishments in Northern Rhodesia